In mathematics, the Oka coherence theorem, proved by , states that the sheaf  of germs of  holomorphic functions on  over a complex manifold is coherent.

See also
 Cartan's theorems A and B
 Several complex variables
 GAGA
 Oka–Weil theorem
 Weierstrass preparation theorem

Note

References

Theorems in complex analysis
Theorems in complex geometry